The Three Sisters is a 1966 American drama film directed by Paul Bogart and starring Geraldine Page and Shelley Winters. It is based on the 1901 play by Anton Chekhov.

Plot

Cast
Geraldine Page as Olga
Shelley Winters as Natalya
Kim Stanley as Masha
Sandy Dennis as Irina
Kevin McCarthy as Vershinin
Gerald Hiken as Andrei
David Paulsen as Roday
Albert Paulsen as Kulygin
Luther Adler as Chebutykin
James Olson as Baron Tuzenbach
Robert Loggia as Solyoni
John Harkins as Fedotik
Salem Ludwig as Ferapont
Tamara Daykarhanova as Anfisa
Marcia Haufrecht
Mary Mercier
Janice Mars
Brooks Morton
Delos V. Smith, Jr.
James Tolkan
Nadyne Turney

References

External links

1966 films
1966 directorial debut films
1966 drama films
American black-and-white films
American drama films
Films based on Three Sisters
Films directed by Paul Bogart
Films produced by Ely Landau
1960s English-language films
1960s American films